Matthew Centrowitz Jr. (born October 18, 1989) is an American middle-distance runner who is the 2016 Olympic champion in the 1500 meters.

He became a prominent figure in U.S. running when he won a bronze medal at the 2011 World Championships in Athletics. A seasoned competitor with a potent finishing kick, he competed at the 2012 Summer Olympics in the 1500 meters—where he finished 4th by only 0.04 seconds. At the 2013 World Championships in Athletics, Centrowitz improved on his bronze medal performance with a silver in the same event.

At the 2016 World Indoor Championships, he won his first major international championship in the 1500 meters. He then won the gold medal in the 1500 meters at the 2016 Summer Olympics in Rio de Janeiro with the slowest winning time since 1932, becoming the first U.S. runner to win the event since 1908.

Early life and background
Centrowitz was born in Beltsville, Maryland, the son of Beverly (Bannister) and two-time Olympian Matt Centrowitz, who was the head track coach at American University in Washington, D.C. Centrowitz Jr.'s father is of Jewish and Irish ancestry, and his mother is from Guyana. Centrowitz grew up in Arnold, Maryland.

Running career

High school
Centrowitz was a track star at Broadneck High School in Annapolis.  His negative split 8:41.55 win in the 2-mile race at the Nike Outdoor Nationals was described as one of the best races in prep history and was also the best high school time of 2007. His time of 4:08.38 for the mile at the Penn Relays in April 2007 established a meet record. That same year, he also set the Maryland state record over 1600 meters in 4:04.09 and won a gold medal at the Pan American Junior Championships held in São Paulo, Brazil in the 1500m run.

College
Like his father, Centrowitz ran for the Oregon Ducks.  In 2009, Centrowitz's split of 3.59.53 helped break the NCAA 4 x mile record on May 10 with teammates Andrew Wheating (3:59.60), Shadrack Kiptoo-Biwott (4:05.21), and Galen Rupp (3:58.93), shaving a little more than a second off of the old record with a 16:03.24.

In 2011 Centrowitz won the 1500 meters in the Pac-10 and the NCAA Men's Division I Outdoor Track and Field Championships. 

On November 29, 2011, Centrowitz announced his decision to turn professional.

Professional
Centrowitz joined the Nike Oregon Project in 2011, where he was coached by Alberto Salazar. Centrowitz outkicked Bernard Lagat and Leo Manzano at the 2011 USATF Outdoor Championships in the 1500m. He won a bronze medal in the 2011 IAAF World Championships in Athletics in the 1500m behind Asbel Kiprop and Silas Kiplagat.

In 2012, Centrowitz qualified for the IAAF World Indoor Championships in Istanbul, Turkey by getting second in the national indoor 1500m championship, behind Manzano and in front of teammate Galen Rupp. He finished 7th in the World Championship Indoor 1500m final, with a time of 3:47.42. On July 1, 2012, Centrowitz qualified for the United States Olympic team in the 1500 m. He finished in fourth place in the 2012 London Olympic Games in the 1,500 meter race, missing the bronze medal by .04 seconds with a time of 3:35.17. He won the Fifth Avenue Mile ahead of Bernard Lagat in September.

During the 2013 indoor season, his first race was at the Seattle UW Indoor Preview, where he won the 800m. He was second at the Millrose Games Wanamaker Mile. He was first at the New Balance Indoor Grand Prix mile. At the USATF Indoor Championships, he was fourth in the 800m and 8th in the mile. To kick off his outdoor season, he took part in the Penn Relays USA vs. The World, where his team took fourth in the DMR with a time of 9:19.33. He was sixth at the Oxy High Performance meet in the 1500m. He was tenth in the Prefontaine Classic Bowerman Mile, setting a personal best of 3:51.79. He won the USATF Outdoor 1500m championship for the second time, which qualified him for the IAAF World Championships in Moscow. He won the silver medal in Moscow with a time of 3:36.78.

Centrowitz spent the 2014 outdoor season lowering his PRs. At the Diamond League meet in Monaco, he achieved a nearly one second personal best in the 1500 meters best by clocking 3:31.09, which ranked seventh in United States history at the time.

On February 20, 2016, Centrowitz won the Millrose Games men's indoor mile in 3:50.63, edging off Nick Willis.

On March 20, 2016, Centrowitz won the 1500 meters at the World Indoor Championships, wrapping up an unbeaten indoor season.

On August 20, 2016, Centrowitz competed at the 2016 Olympic Games, where he won the 1500 meters race in 3:50.00, becoming the first American to win the event since Mel Sheppard in 1908. The race was tactical and the pace slow at the start; the first four finalists in the T13 1500m men's final at the 2016 Summer Paralympics all finished faster than Centrowitz.

In January 2019, Centrowitz moved to the Bowerman Track Club under the coaching of Jerry Schumacher.

In 2021, after qualifying for the Olympics, Centrowitz ran in a specially set up mile run as a tune-up for the Olympics.  While his pacers dropped off the pace earlier than expected, he still finished in a new personal best of 3:49.26.

Centrowitz competed in the delayed 2020 Tokyo Olympic games in the 1500. In the heats of the 1500, he coasted through the slowest heat with a time of 3:41.12. In the semifinals he placed 9th, failing to qualify for the finals and defend his 1500m Olympic title.

Personal life
Centrowitz is Catholic.

His sister Lauren Centrowitz is also an elite runner, qualifying for the Olympic Trials in 2012.

As of June 2020, he was dating Shelby Houlihan, a fellow 1500m runner.

Competition record

References

External links

 
 
 University of Oregon bio: Matthew Centrowitz Jr.

1989 births
Living people
Track and field athletes from Maryland
People from Arnold, Maryland
People from Beltsville, Maryland
American male middle-distance runners
Olympic male middle-distance runners
Olympic gold medalists for the United States in track and field
Athletes (track and field) at the 2012 Summer Olympics
Athletes (track and field) at the 2016 Summer Olympics
Medalists at the 2016 Summer Olympics
World Athletics Championships athletes for the United States
World Athletics Championships medalists
Oregon Ducks men's track and field athletes
American sportspeople of Guyanese descent
American people of Irish descent
American people of Jewish descent
University of Oregon alumni
USA Outdoor Track and Field Championships winners
World Athletics Indoor Championships winners
African-American Catholics
Athletes (track and field) at the 2020 Summer Olympics